The Abraj Al Lulu is a large residential project located in Manama, the capital city of Bahrain. The entire project consists of three large towers, two of which have 50 floors and one with 40. The three towers (Gold Pearl, Silver Pearl and the Black Pearl) are located next to the King Faisal Highway, which is close to popular landmarks such as the Pearl Roundabout, NBB Tower, Bahrain WTC and the Bahrain Financial Harbor.

Design 
Abraj Al Lulu was constructed by the Al Hamad Contracting Company, following the architectural designs plotted out by the following three architects:
 Jafar Tukan
 Cowi Al Moayed
 Habib Mudara

The complex, completed in March 2009, can accommodate over 1,100 cars in its four-storey parking lot, and consists of over 860 luxury 1-to-3 bedroom apartments. The skyscrapers of Abraj Al Lulu is one of the many tall buildings of the Manama skyline.

See also 
 List of tallest structures in Bahrain
 List of twin buildings and structures

External links 
 
Buildings and structures in Manama
Skyscrapers in Bahrain
Residential skyscrapers
Twin towers
Residential buildings completed in 2009